The Frank T. and Polly Lewis House is located in Lodi, Wisconsin, United States. It was added to the National Register of Historic Places in 2009. The house is located within the Portage Street Historic District.

References

Houses in Columbia County, Wisconsin
Houses completed in 1902
Houses on the National Register of Historic Places in Wisconsin
Queen Anne architecture in Wisconsin
Lodi, Wisconsin
National Register of Historic Places in Columbia County, Wisconsin